Gheorghe Hagi (born 5 February 1965) is a Romanian professional football manager and former player, who is currently the owner and manager of Liga I club Farul Constanța. Deployed as an attacking midfielder, Hagi was considered one of the best players in the world during the 1980s and '90s, and is regarded by many as the greatest Romanian footballer of all time. Fans of Turkish club Galatasaray, with whom Hagi ended his career, called him "Comandante" ("The Commander"), while he was known as "Regele" ("The King") to Romanian supporters. Nicknamed "The Maradona of the Carpathians", he was a creative advanced playmaker renowned for his dribbling, technique, vision, passing and shooting.

After starting his playing career in Romania, with Farul Constanța, and subsequently featuring for Sportul Studențesc and Steaua București, he later also had spells in Spain with Real Madrid and FC Barcelona, Italy with Brescia, and Turkey, with Galatasaray; as such, Hagi is one of the few footballers to have played for both Spanish rival clubs Real Madrid and Barcelona. Throughout his club career, he won numerous titles while playing in four different countries: he won three Romanian League titles, two Cupa României titles, and the European Super Cup with Steaua București – also reaching the final of the 1988–89 European Cup –, a Supercopa de España title with Real Madrid, the Anglo-Italian Cup with Brescia, another Supercopa de España title with Barcelona, and four Süper Lig titles, two Turkish Cups, two Turkish Super Cups, the UEFA Cup, and the UEFA Super Cup with Galatasaray.

At international level, Hagi played for the Romania national team in three FIFA World Cups, in 1990, 1994 (where he was named in the World Cup All-Star Team after helping his nation to the quarter-finals of the tournament) and 1998; as well as in three UEFA European Championships, in 1984, 1996 and 2000. He won a total of 124 caps for Romania between 1983 and 2000, making him the second-most capped Romanian player of all time, behind only Dorinel Munteanu; he is also the joint all-time leading goalscorer of the Romania national side (alongside Adrian Mutu) with 35 goals.

Hagi is considered a hero both in his homeland and in Turkey. He was named Romanian Footballer of the Year a record seven times, and is regarded as one of the best football players of his generation. Hagi was nominated six times for the Ballon d'Or, his best performance being a 4th place in 1994. In November 2003, to celebrate UEFA's Jubilee, Hagi was selected as the Golden Player of Romania by the Romanian Football Federation as their most outstanding player of the past 50 years. In 2004, he was named by Pelé as one of the 125 Greatest Living Footballers at a FIFA Awards Ceremony. In 1999, he was ranked at number 25 in World Soccer Magazines list of the 100 greatest players of the 20th century.

Following his retirement in 2001, Hagi pursued a managerial career, coaching the Romania national team, as well as clubs in both Romania and Turkey, namely Bursaspor, Galatasaray, Politehnica Timișoara, Steaua București, Viitorul Constanța and Farul Constanța. In 2009, he founded Romanian club Viitorul Constanța, which he has coached between 2014 and 2020. Hagi also established his namesake football academy, one of the largest ones in Southeastern Europe.

Club career
Hagi started his career playing for the youth teams of FC Constanța under the guidance of coach Iosif Bükössy in the 1970s. He was selected by the Romanian Football Federation to join the squad of Luceafărul București in 1980, where he remained for two years. In 1982, he returned to FC Constanța, making his Divizia A debut under coach Emanoil Hașoti in a 3–0 loss against SC Bacău, but one year later, aged 18, he was prepared to make the step up to play for a top team. He was originally directed to Universitatea Craiova, but chose Sportul Studențesc of Bucharest instead.

In late 1986, Hagi transferred to Steaua București as the team prepared for the European Super Cup final against Dynamo Kyiv. The original contract was for a one-game loan only, the final. However, after winning the trophy, in which Hagi scored the only goal of the match from a free kick, Steaua did not want to release him back to Sportul Studențesc and retained him. During his Steaua years (1987–1990), Hagi played 97 Liga I games, scoring 76 goals, and netted 98 goals in total in 107 appearances for the club across all competitions. With the club, he reached the European Cup semi-final in 1988, and the final in the following year, while Hagi finished as one of the competition's top scorers in the former edition of the tournament. Hagi also won three consecutive league and Cup doubles with Steaua between 1987 and 1989. His strong performances had him linked with Arrigo Sacchi's Milan, fellow Serie A club Juventus, and German side Bayern Munich, but Nicolae Ceaușescu's communist government rejected any offer.

After impressing at the 1990 FIFA World Cup, Hagi was signed by Spanish club Real Madrid on 27 June that same year; the La Liga side paid $3.5 million to Steaua București in order to acquire him. Hagi played two seasons with Real Madrid, which were largely unsuccessful, scoring 20 goals in 84 games, and only winning the Supercopa de España; some of his most memorable performances for the club included a hat-trick in a 5–0 home win over Athletic Bilbao at the Santiago Bernabéu Stadium, on match-day 22 of the 1991–92 season, and a 40-yard lob against Osasuna during the same campaign. He also helped Los Blancos to reach the 1991–92 UEFA Cup semi-finals, contributing with 3 goals scored in 10 appearances. He was subsequently sold to Italian side Brescia for 8 billion lira in 1992.

Hagi began the 1992–93 season with Brescia in Serie A, but after his first season, the club was relegated to Serie B. The following season, Hagi helped the club win the Anglo-Italian Cup, with Brescia defeating Notts County 1–0 in the final at Wembley, and also helped the team finish third in Serie B and earn promotion back to Serie A. After performing memorably during the 1994 World Cup, Hagi returned to Spain, and was signed by defending La Liga champions Barcelona for £2 million, where he immediately won his second Supercopa de España title; however, he later struggled to gain playing time at the club under manager Johan Cruyff, but managed to give his contribution by scoring 3 goals in 5 matches when Barça reached the semi-finals in the 1995–96 UEFA Cup season.

After two years at Barça, Hagi signed for Turkish club Galatasaray in 1996, at the age of 31. He had been the subject of a competing transfer offer from São Paulo FC. Although in the twilight of his career, at Galatasaray, he was extremely successful, and became highly popular among the Turkish supporters, due to his excellent performances for the club. Hagi was an important member of the Galatasaray team that went on to win four consecutive league titles between 1996 and 2000. In 2000, at age 35, Hagi had one of the best seasons of his career, winning every possible major title with Galatasaray that season. Most significantly, Hagi captained the club to win the 1999–2000 UEFA Cup after defeating Arsenal on penalties in the final, following a 0–0 draw; during the match, Hagi was sent off in extra-time for punching Arsenal captain Tony Adams. Consequently, Galatasaray became the first Turkish club to win a UEFA club competition title. The team's UEFA Cup triumph was immediately followed by the UEFA Super Cup title, with a historic 2–1 win against Hagi's former club Real Madrid in extra-time. The mass hysteria caused by these wins in Istanbul raised Hagi's popularity with the fans even further, and prompted former France international Luis Fernández to say, "Hagi is like wine, the older it gets, the better it is."

When he retired in 2001, Hagi was one of the most popular players in both Turkey and Romania. Hagi drew praise from the Galatasaray supporters for his performances during his time with the club, who adopted the chant "I Love You Hagi" in his honour. While coaching Galatasaray in 2004, he briefly came out of retirement to play in the testimonial game for his former teammate Suat Kaya against Turkey XI. Hagi played the first half wearing his iconic shirt number 10 and helped Galatasaray win 2–1.

International career
Gheorghe Hagi made his debut for Romania on 10 August 1983 at the age of 18, under coach Mircea Lucescu who used him in all the minutes of friendly which ended 0–0 against Norway, played on the Ullevaal stadium from Oslo. He scored his first international goal against Northern Ireland in 1984. The following year, he was made captain for the first time, in a World Cup qualifier against the same opponent.

Although Romania failed to qualify for the 1986 World Cup, Hagi later took part at the 1990 World Cup, where he helped the team reach the round of 16, before Republic of Ireland ended their run, after winning the resulting penalty shoot-out following a 0–0 draw, with Hagi netting Romania's first spot kick. Four years later, he led the Romanian team to its best ever international performance at the 1994 World Cup, as they reached the quarter-finals, only to lose to Sweden in a penalty shoot-out once again. Hagi scored three times in the tournament, including a memorable goal in their 3–2 surprise defeat of South American powerhouse and previous runners-up Argentina. In the first of Romania's group stage matches, a 3–1 win against Colombia, Hagi provided two assists and scored one of the most memorable goals of the tournament, curling in a 40-yard lob over Colombian goalkeeper Óscar Córdoba who was caught out of position; the goal was later voted the fifth greatest World Cup goal in a FIFAworldcup.com poll. Hagi was named in the Team of the Tournament for his performances.

Four years later, he captained Romania at the 1998 World Cup; Hagi initially communicated that France '98 would be his final tournament. Romania topped their group, which featured England, Colombia, and Tunisia, and reached the round of 16, before being eliminated by Croatia. After the tournament, Hagi retired from the national team, only to change his mind after a few months and participate in UEFA Euro 2000, during which he was sent off in the 2–0 quarter-final loss against eventual runners-up Italy; this was his final international appearance.

Hagi retired from professional football in 2001, at the age of 36; that year, he was given a send-off in a testimonial game on 24 April, called "Gala Hagi," featuring a team of Romanian All-Stars against a team of international All-Stars. At the time of his retirement, his 124 caps for his country were a national record, which has since been surpassed by Dorinel Munteanu. He currently still holds the record of most goals scored for the Romania national team, alongside Adrian Mutu, with 35.

Career as coach

Romania national team
In 2001, Hagi was named the manager of the Romania national team, replacing Ladislau Bölöni, who left the squad to coach Sporting Clube de Portugal. After failing to qualify the team for the World Cup, Hagi was sacked. His only notable achievement during the six months as Romania's manager was the win in Budapest against Hungary.

Bursaspor
In 2003, Hagi took over as coach of Turkish Süper Lig side Bursaspor, but left the club after a disappointing start to the season.

Galatasaray
Hagi then became manager of Galatasaray in 2004, leading the team to the Turkish Cup in 2005 final with 5–1 as a score against fierce rivals Fenerbahçe. His contract, however, was not renewed since his team was not able to win 2004–05 Süper Lig title over Fenerbahçe during the centennial of the club.

Politehnica Timișoara
Steaua București sought to hire Hagi in the summer of 2005, but Hagi's requested wage could not be met by the Romanian champions, and he became manager of Politehnica Timișoara instead. However, after a string of poor results and disagreements with management, he left the club after a few months. Constanța's main stadium used to bear his name, but the name was changed after Hagi signed with Politehnica Timișoara.

FC Steaua București
From June to September 2007, Hagi coached FC Steaua București, had a mediocre start in the internal championship mainly due to the large number of unavailable injured players, and managed to qualify the team for the second time in line to the UEFA Champions League group stages, passing two qualifying rounds. He resigned due to a long series of conflicts with club owner Gigi Becali, which also happens to be his godson. The main reason for resigning was the owner's policy of imposing players, making the team's strategy and threats. Hagi's resigned mere hours after FC Steaua's first Champions League match away against Slavia Prague, a 2–1 loss.

Galatasaray return
After Frank Rijkaard was sacked as coach, Hagi signed a one and a half-year contract with Galatasaray on 21 October 2010. His official presentation was held on 22 October. His former teammate from Galatasaray Tugay Kerimoğlu assisted him in Istanbul, but he was sacked on 22 March 2011 after a series of poor results in the Süper Lig.

Viitorul Constanța
In September 2014, Hagi appointed himself manager of Viitorul Constanța, in addition to being the owner and chairman of the club. Successfully avoiding relegation in his first season, Viitorul went on to be the season's wonder in the 2015–16 season, finishing the first half of the regular season on 3rd place, which led Hagi to be named Romania Coach of the Year. Eventually, Viitorul finished the regular season on 4th place, earning their first play-off qualification. Viitorul finished the play-off on 5th place, but qualified for the UEFA Europa League third qualifying round due to Dinamo București's insolvency. In their first European match, Viitorul were defeated 0–5 by Gent at the Ghelamco Arena, and were eliminated after a 0–0 home draw.

Viitorul won their maiden league title, being 2016–17 Liga I champions after a 1–0 home victory over CFR Cluj; they finished the play-off with 44 points, same as FCSB, but on a better head-to-head record after a 3–1 home victory over FCSB. As a result, Hagi won his second Romania Coach of the Year award.

Style of play
A talented left-footed attacking midfielder, Hagi's playing style was frequently compared with Diego Maradona's throughout his career, due to his technical ability as well as his temperamental character and leadership; as a youth, he was mainly inspired by compatriots Anghel Iordănescu and Ion Dumitru. A quick, agile, creative, and mobile advanced playmaker, Hagi was also tactically versatile, and capable of playing in several midfield and offensive positions on either wing or through the middle, due to his ability with both feet, despite being naturally left-footed, although he had a preference for using his stronger foot; his preferred position was in a free role as a classic number 10, but he was also used as a second striker on occasion. Hagi was renowned in particular for his first touch and speed on the ball, as well as his timing, interpretation of space, bursts of acceleration, agility, quick feet, balance, flair and dribbling skills, which enabled him to get past defenders; he was also highly regarded for his vision and precise passing, although he was capable of both scoring and assisting goals, and was also an accurate finisher and set-piece taker, who had a penchant for scoring goals from powerful, bending long range strikes. Despite his small stature and slender build, Hagi possessed significant upper body strength, which, along with his control, aided him in protecting the ball from opponents, and allowed him to create space for himself or his teammates. Despite his skill and his reputation as one of the greatest number 10s of his generation, his career was marked by inconsistency at times, and he was also considered to be a controversial player, due to his rebellious and arrogant attitude, as well as his low work-rate, aggression, unsportsmanlike behaviour, and lack of discipline, which led him to have several disagreements and confrontations with his managers, opponents, and officials.

Personal life
Gheorghe Hagi was born to Chirata Hagi, his mother, and Iancu Hagi, his father. Hagi’s grandfather was one of 40,000 ethnic Aromanians who fled Greece to Romania. He set up home in the village of Săcele, near Constanța on the Black Sea coast. Hagi has fond memories of his grandfather who, like many Aromanians, was a shepherd According to him,  “I was proud when he, who was called Gheorghe like me, asked me to go and spend the whole day with him minding the sheep,” he said. “I loved to eat cheese and tomatoes with him, and that is still my favorite food today.” He also said "ambition is the main quality of the Aromanians". Hagi is currently married to Marilena Hagi, with whom he had two children, Ianis and Kira.

His son, Ianis Hagi, who is also a footballer, was born in 1998 in Istanbul, Turkey, when he was playing for Galatasaray SK. Ianis currently plays for Scottish club Rangers.

His daughter, Kira Hagi, who was born in 1996, in Barcelona, Catalonia, Spain, when he was playing for Barcelona, is an actress.

Hagi was chosen to dub in Romanian the character Dagda in the animated movie Epic.

Career statistics

Club

International

Scores and results list Romania's goal tally first, score column indicates score after each Hagi goal.

Managerial statistics

Honours

Player
Steaua București
Divizia A: 1986–87, 1987–88, 1988–89
Cupa României: 1986–87, 1988–89
European Super Cup: 1986
Intercontinental Cup runners-up: 1986
European Cup runners-up: 1988–89

Real Madrid
Supercopa de España: 1990

Brescia
Anglo-Italian Cup: 1993–94

Barcelona
Supercopa de España: 1994

Galatasaray
1.Lig: 1996–97, 1997–98, 1998–99, 1999–2000
Turkish Cup: 1998–99, 1999–2000
Turkish Super Cup: 1996, 1997
UEFA Cup: 1999–2000
UEFA Super Cup: 2000

Manager
Galatasaray
Turkish Cup: 2004–05

Viitorul Constanța
Liga I: 2016–17
Cupa României: 2018–19
Supercupa României: 2019

Individual
Divizia A top scorer: 1985, 1986
European Cup top scorer: 1987–88
Gazeta Sporturilor Romanian Footballer of the Year: 1985, 1987, 1993, 1994, 1997, 1999, 2000
FIFA World Cup All-Star Team: 1994
Ballon d'Or: 4th place 1994
FIFA XI: 1998
Turkish Footballer of the Year: 1996, 1999, 2000
World Soccer Magazines 100 Greatest Players of the 20th century: 1999 (#25)
UEFA Jubilee Awards – Greatest Romanian Footballer of the last 50 Years: 2003
FIFA 100: 2004
Golden Foot Legends Award: 2015
Romania Coach of the Year: 2015, 2017

See also
List of top international men's football goalscorers by country
The 100 Greatest Players of the 20th Century
List of footballers with 100 or more caps

Notes

References

External links

 
 
 
 

1965 births
Living people
People from Constanța County
Romanian people of Aromanian descent
Aromanian sportspeople
Romanian footballers
Romania international footballers
Romanian football managers
Romanian expatriate football managers
Association football midfielders
FCV Farul Constanța players
FC Sportul Studențesc București players
FC Steaua București players
Galatasaray S.K. footballers
Real Madrid CF players
FC Barcelona players
Brescia Calcio players
La Liga players
Serie A players
Serie B players
Liga I players
Süper Lig players
Expatriate footballers in Spain
Expatriate footballers in Italy
Expatriate footballers in Turkey
Romanian expatriate footballers
Romanian expatriate sportspeople in Italy
Romanian expatriate sportspeople in Spain
Romanian expatriate sportspeople in Turkey
Bursaspor managers
FC Steaua București managers
FC Politehnica Timișoara managers
Galatasaray S.K. (football) managers
FC Viitorul Constanţa managers
FCV Farul Constanța managers
Süper Lig managers
Expatriate football managers in Turkey
UEFA Golden Players
FIFA 100
UNICEF Goodwill Ambassadors
1990 FIFA World Cup players
1994 FIFA World Cup players
1998 FIFA World Cup players
UEFA Euro 1984 players
UEFA Euro 1996 players
UEFA Euro 2000 players
FIFA Century Club
Romania national football team managers
UEFA Cup winning players
UEFA Champions League top scorers